Julie Hawkes (née Lamb; born 1948 in New Zealand) is a squash player who represented Hong Kong through the majority of her career.

She completed her secondary education at Matamata College in 1966, where she won awards in tennis and netball and served as head girl. She first took up squash while studying for a degree in physical education at Otago University; she later completed her teachers' training at Auckland Teachers' College. After moving to Wellington, Hawkes played squash for New Zealand during this time, and was ranked number two on the women's team. She went to South Africa to compete with the New Zealand Women's Team in 1975.

Shortly after her marriage to lawyer and tennis player Richard Hawkes, the family moved to Hong Kong, where she began to represent Hong Kong in international squash tournaments.

Hawkes won local and regional squash competitions while competing for Hong Kong at the international level. She was the Women's Over 35 World Champion at the World Master Squash Championships in 1985. On the 40th anniversary of the founding of the organization Hong Kong Squash, Hawkes received the "Outstanding Athlete" award for her championship-winning record.

After her time as a player ended, Hawkes turned to coaching. In the early 2000s, she coached squash champion Leilani Rorani. In 2003, she received a New Zealand "Prime Minister’s Coach Professional Development Scholarship" for her coaching work. In 2007, she was named New Zealand's Squash Coach of the Year.

Hawkes has also served as a World Squash Foundation (WSF) Referee.

The Hawkes family lived in Hong Kong for twenty-three years. Julie and Richard Hawkes have four children, one of whom, Jaclyn Hawkes, is also pursuing a career in squash, though she plays for New Zealand. Jaclyn Hawkes was the 2010 Commonwealth Games medallists in Women's Doubles Squash.

Awards 
 International Championships (representing Hong Kong)
 Second place, Champion, East Asian Women’s Squash Championship
 Champion, Women's Over 35, World Master Squash Championships (1985). 
 Champion, Women's Individual, 3rd Asian Squash Championships (22 Jan – 1 Feb 1986, Kuala Lumpur, Malaysia)
 Champion, Women's Over 35, World Masters Squash Championships (1987, Auckland, New Zealand).
 Second place, Champion, Women's Over 40, World Master Squash Championships (1989).
 Other Championships:
 Squash Women's Cup Champion, Hong Kong Football Club (1990-1992)
 Squash Ladies' Cup Champion, Hong Kong Football Club (1984-1985, 1987-1990)

References 

New Zealand female squash players
1948 births
Living people
Hong Kong female squash players